Star Ray TV is an independent pirate community television station in Toronto, Ontario, Canada. The station, which broadcasts in digital on channel 22 in Toronto's Beaches neighbourhood, was launched in 1997 when Jan Pachul, an amateur radio operator, applied to the Canadian Radio-television and Telecommunications Commission (CRTC) for a licence to serve the community. Star Ray TV has temporary authority from Innovation, Science and Economic Development Canada (formerly Industry Canada from 1993 to 2015) to transmit on UHF channel 15 and 22 in Toronto with call sign VX9AMK.

History

On August 21, 2000, after five interventions from established broadcasters, the CRTC turned down Pachul's application, on the grounds that it did not meet with the CRTC's low-power broadcasting (LPTV) policy, but Pachul alleged that the CRTC was simply protecting established corporate broadcasters who had already failed in their responsibility to provide programming of community interest. On September 9, the station began broadcasting illegally as a pirate station.

Pachul appeared before the CRTC on September 19, 2001, and was ordered to shut the station down by November 15 of that year. In December, the CRTC published a new policy permitting the development of community stations on LPTV.

At one point in 2002, Star Ray broadcast on UHF 15 as text-only, based on a loophole by which it claimed text did not constitute "programming" and was therefore not prohibited. More recently, Star Ray has faced allegations that its operations interfere with VHF channel 13, home to CTV's CKCO-DT in Kitchener.

In recent years, the station has broadcast over the Internet. Pachul applied for another broadcasting licence on June 3, 2004, but as of 2008 the CRTC has not published a decision either approving or denying the 2004 licence application.

Since its inception, Star Ray broadcast on UHF channel 15. However, since CHCH-DT moved its signal to UHF 15 on December 2, 2013, Pachul moved Star Ray TV to UHF channel 22 and began broadcasting in digital with a new ATSC transmitter on December 13, 2013, with the virtual channel remaining 15 via PSIP.

References

External links
 Star Ray TV
VX9AMK (STAR RAY) history - Canadian Communication Foundation
 Internet Broadcasting from Toronto
 TOchat, Star Ray's online forum

Television stations in Toronto
Mass media regulation in Canada
Pirate television stations
Canadian community channels
Television channels and stations established in 1997
1997 establishments in Ontario